The Nordic Orthopaedic Federation is the orthopaedic federation for the Nordic and other Northern European countries. It was founded 1919. The current president is Richard Wallensten of Karolinska University Hospital. Member countries were Denmark, The Netherlands, Estonia, Finland, Iceland, Lithuania, Norway and Sweden as of June 2021.

The federation consists of the following national orthopaedic associations:
Danish Orthopaedic Society
Finnish Orthopaedic Association
Icelandic Orthopaedic Society
Norwegian Orthopaedic Association
Swedish Orthopaedic Association
Dutch Orthopaedic Association
Estonian Orthopaedic Society

References

International medical associations of Europe